Sketch is an Indian Malayalam language action thriller film starring Saiju Kurup in the lead role. It was released in 2007.

Cast
 Saiju Kurup as Shiva
 Rajan P. Dev as Chandrasekhara Shetty
 Sindhu Menon as Lakshmi
 Thodupuzha Vasanthi
 Jagathy Sreekumar as Partha Saradhi
Suraj Venjaramoodu as Bhaskaran
Shobha Mohan
T. G. Ravi as Koyakka
Santhakumari
 Vijayakumar as Vishwanathan IPS
 Vijayaraghavan as Alexander Nambadan
 Sreejith Ravi as Basheer

References

External links 
 

2007 films
2000s Malayalam-language films